Mary Bozana Timony (born October 17, 1970) is an American independent singer-songwriter, guitarist, keyboardist, and violist. She has been a member of the bands Helium, Autoclave and Wild Flag, and currently fronts Ex Hex.

Timony's music is often heavy and dark, frequently using drones, beats, and modal melodies reminiscent of European Medieval music. She uses a number of alternate guitar tunings, most prominent of which is DADGAE.

Her unique style has been cited as an influence amongst well respected and admired musicians such as Carrie Brownstein of Sleater-Kinney, Sadie Dupuis of Speedy Ortiz and many more.

Biography
Timony was born to James and Joan Timony of Washington, D.C., and raised in the neighborhoods of Glover Park and Wesley Heights. As a teenager, she attended the Duke Ellington School of the Arts in Georgetown where she played guitar in the jazz band and also studied viola. Her guitar teacher Tom Newman recalled to interviewers: “She came to us a prodigy. You can’t teach what she has.”

In 1990–91 Timony played guitar and shared lead vocals in the Washington, D.C.-based band Autoclave. She later relocated to Boston, where she graduated from Boston University with a degree in English literature and formed the band Helium in the summer of 1992, recording two albums and three EPs with the group between 1994 and 1997. Helium disbanded in 1998, whereupon Timony embarked on her solo career, recording albums in 2000 and 2002 (Mountains and The Golden Dove).

In the mid-2000s, Timony moved back to D.C. In 2005, Timony joined with drummer Devin Ocampo; her album Ex Hex, released on the Lookout! Records label, features the two performing together as a duo. In the same year, she contributed vocals to Team Sleep's self-titled album on the tracks "Tomb of Liegia" and "King Diamond."

Her most recent solo album, The Shapes We Make, was released on the Kill Rock Stars label on May 8, 2007. A music video for "Sharp Shooter" was produced by the art collective Paper Rad.

In early 2009, Mary Timony formed a new band, Pow Wow, with Jonah R. Takagi and Winston H. Yu. As of June 2009 the group added T. J. Lipple and changed its name to Soft Power.

In September 2010, Mary Timony and members of Sleater-Kinney, The Minders, and Quasi announced that they were working on a new album under the moniker Wild Flag. It was released on Merge Records on September 13, 2011.

After Wild Flag's breakup, Timony formed Ex Hex with Fire Tapes bassist Betsy Wright, and The Aquarium drummer Laura Harris. Their debut album Rips was released on Merge Records in October 2014. Her former bandmate Jonah Takagi produced both Rips and the group's sophomore effort, It's Real (released in March 2019 on Merge Records).

Since 2018, she has been a member of Hammered Hulls.

Her brother, Patrick Timony, is the keyboard player for the band The Picture is Dead.

There is a reference to Mary Timony in the lyrics to the song "Your Bruise" by the American indie rock band Death Cab for Cutie, from their 1998 debut album Something About Airplanes.

Side projects
In addition to her work with Autoclave, Helium, and the Mary Timony Band, Timony has occasionally collaborated or recorded with other groups. In 1999, Timony recorded a four-song vinyl EP with Carrie Brownstein of the band Sleater-Kinney, in a duo called The Spells. In 2000, she recorded a six-song CD with Anna Johansson and Erin Maclean, entitled Green 4.

In 1995, Timony recorded the song "All Dressed Up In Dreams" with Stephin Merritt, on The 6ths album Wasps' Nests. She also recorded vocals for a one-off alt-country project called Lincoln '65. This project's sole output was a 7" single released by Slow River Records in 1996, labeled simply Lincoln '65, and contained two tracks, "Dreams" and "Jellyfish".

Timony collaborated with Team Sleep on Tomb of Liegia and King Diamond on their 2005 self-titled album. In 2007 she recorded an album with Garland of Hours, a group that features cellist Amy Domingues.

Films
Timony had a role in the 1997 independent film All Over Me as lead singer/guitarist of the fictional girl rock band Coochie Pop, along with another real-life singer/guitarist, Leisha Hailey. They performed the Helium song "Hole in the Ground" in the movie.

She also appeared in a short film by the name Dream Machine in 2000, directed by Brett Vapnek.

Discography

Autoclave
Autoclave Combined CD of 10" and 7" originally released 1991 (Dischord Records, 2002)

Helium
Pirate Prude EP (Matador Records, 1994)
The Dirt of Luck (Matador Records, 1995)
Superball+ EP (Matador Records, 1995)
No Guitars EP (Matador Records, 1997)
The Magic City (Matador Records, 1997)

Mind Science of the Mind
Mind Science of the Mind (Epic Records, 1996)

The Spells
The Age of Backwards EP (International Pop Underground (K Records), 1999)
Bat Vs. Bird EP (2008)

Green 4
Green 4 (limited edition CD-R, 2000)

Mary Timony
Mountains (Matador Records, 2000)
The Golden Dove (Matador Records, 2002)
Ex Hex  (Lookout! Records, 2005)

Mary Timony Band
The Shapes We Make (Kill Rock Stars, 2007)

Garland of Hours
The Soundest Serum (Noble Task Records, 2007)

Wild Flag
Wild Flag (Merge Records, 2011)

Ex Hex
Rips (Merge Records, 2014)
Hot and Cold 7" (Merge Records, 2014)
It's Real (Merge Records, 2019)

Hammered Hulls
Hammered Hulls EP (Dischord Records, 2019)
Careening LP (Dischord Records, 2022)

References

External links
Mary Timony on Myspace

1970 births
Boston University College of Arts and Sciences alumni
Women rock singers
Living people
Singers from Washington, D.C.
Guitarists from Washington, D.C.
Wild Flag members
21st-century American women singers
21st-century American women guitarists
21st-century American guitarists
21st-century American singers